Cole (for Bruton) railway station was a station on the Somerset and Dorset Railway in South Somerset, serving the village of Cole, which is now virtually joined to the village of Pitcombe and the small town of Bruton.

Cole was the station where the Dorset Central Railway line from Templecombe met the Somerset Central Railway line from Glastonbury and Street railway station in 1862. Later that year the two companies combined to form the Somerset and Dorset Railway.

Just north of the station the line crossed the Wilts, Somerset and Weymouth Railway although the two railways were not connected here.

The goods yard closed on 5 April 1965 and Cole station was closed with the railway in the Beeching cuts in 1966.

References

Somerset Railway Stations, by Mike Oakley (Dovecote Press, 2002)

External links
 Station on navigable O.S. map

Disused railway stations in Somerset
Former Somerset and Dorset Joint Railway stations
Railway stations in Great Britain opened in 1862
Railway stations in Great Britain closed in 1966
Beeching closures in England
Bruton
1862 establishments in England